The 2018 Women's South American Volleyball Club Championship was the tenth official edition of the women's volleyball tournament, played by six teams from 20 to 24 February 2018 in Belo Horizonte, Brazil. Camponesa/Minas won its first title and qualified for the 2018 FIVB Volleyball Women's Club World Championship in Ningbo, China. Carol Gattaz was elected the Most Valuable Player.

Competing clubs
Teams were seeded in two pools of three according to how the representatives of their countries finished in the 2016 edition.

Preliminary round

Pool A

|}

|}

Pool B

|}

|}

Final round

Bracket

Fifth place match

|}

Semifinals

|}

Third place match

|}

Final

|}

Final standing

All-Star team

Most Valuable Player
 Carol Gattaz (Camponesa/Minas)
Best Opposite
 Holly Toliver (Regatas Lima)
Best Outside Hitters
 Rosamaria Montibeller (Camponesa/Minas)
 Drussyla Costa (Rexona-Sesc)

Best Setter
 Macris Carneiro (Camponesa/Minas) 
Best Middle Blockers
 Juciely Cristina Barreto (Rexona-Sesc)
 Mayhara Silva (Rexona-Sesc)
Best Libero
 Léia Silva (Camponesa/Minas)

See also
2018 Men's South American Volleyball Club Championship

References

South American Volleyball Club Championship
2018 in Brazilian sport
2018
International volleyball competitions hosted by Brazil
Sport in Minas Gerais
February 2018 sports events in South America
2018 in Brazilian women's sport